Antonio "Tony" Genato (born June 9, 1929) is a retired Filipino basketball player who competed in the 1952 Summer Olympics, the 1956 Summer Olympics and at the 1954 FIBA World Championship.

Biography
Genato had his high school education at the San Beda College. He did not play competitive basketball during his high school years due to a lack of competitions during the war years. Genato took his pre-med studies also in  San Beda. He played three seasons for the San Beda Red Lions in the NCAA. After finishing his pre-med studies at San Beda, Genato took a course in Medicine at the University of Santo Tomas and joined the YCO in 1952. Genato joined the YCO Athletic Club in 1952. He also worked as manager of Samar Mining during his stint for the Elizalde ball club. 

He captained the Philippine national team that clinched the bronze medal at the 1954 FIBA World Championship in Brazil which remained the best performance of an Asian nation in the international tournament. Genato also took part in the 1952 and 1956 Summer Olympics.

Genato retired from competitive basketball in 1959 at the age of 30. He also became coach of the defunct Great Taste Coffee Makers of the Philippine Basketball Association.

References

External links
 

1929 births
Living people
Basketball players from Manila
Olympic basketball players of the Philippines
Basketball players at the 1952 Summer Olympics
Basketball players at the 1956 Summer Olympics
San Beda Red Lions basketball players
Asian Games medalists in basketball
Basketball players at the 1954 Asian Games
Philippines men's national basketball team players
Filipino men's basketball players
University of Santo Tomas alumni
Asian Games gold medalists for the Philippines
Medalists at the 1954 Asian Games
Filipino men's basketball coaches
1954 FIBA World Championship players
Great Taste Coffee Makers coaches